"Like a Lady" (Monrose song)
"Like a Lady" (Lady A song)

See also
 Treat Her Like a Lady (disambiguation)
 Treat Me Like a Lady (disambiguation)
 Lady Like